There were nine elections to the United States House of Representatives in 1895, during 53rd United States Congress and the 54th United States Congress.

Eight were special elections to fill vacant seats and one was an initial election for a seat in the new state of Utah.

Elections are listed by date and district.

Special elections

53rd United States Congress 

|-
! 
| Myron B. Wright
|  | Republican
| 1888
|  | Incumbent died November 13, 1894.New member elected February 23, 1895.Republican hold.Successor seated February 23, 1895.Winner was not elected to the next term, see below.
| nowrap | 

|}

54th United States Congress

|-
! 
| Myron B. Wright
|  | Republican
| 1888
|  | Incumbent died November 13, 1894.New member elected February 19, 1895.Republican gain.Successor seated December 2, 1895.
| nowrap | 

|-
! 
| Julius C. Burrows
|  | Republican
| 1884
|  | Incumbent resigned January 23, 1895 when elected U.S. senator.New member elected April 1, 1895.Republican hold.Successor seated December 2, 1895.
| nowrap | 

|-
! 
| Philip S. Post
|  | Republican
| 1886
|  | Incumbent died January 6, 1895.New member elected April 2, 1895.Republican hold.Successor seated December 2, 1895.
| nowrap | 

|-
! 
| James C. C. Black
|  | Democratic
| 1892
|  | Resigned March 4, 1895.Incumbent was subsequently elected October 2, 1895.Democratic hold.Successor seated December 2, 1895.Election was unsuccessfully challenged.
| nowrap | 

|-
! 
| Frederick Remann
|  | Republican
| 1894
|  | Incumbent died July 14, 1895.New member elected November 5, 1895.Republican hold.Successor seated December 2, 1895.
| nowrap | 

|-
! 
| colspan=3 | Vacant
|  | Representative-elect Andrew J. Campbell died before the start of Congress.New member elected November 5, 1895.Democratic gain.Successor seated December 2, 1895.
| nowrap | 

|-
! 
| William Cogswell
|  | Republican
| 1886
|  | Incumbent died May 22, 1895.New member elected November 5, 1895.Republican hold.Successor seated December 2, 1895.
| nowrap | 

|}

Utah 

|-
! 
| colspan=3 | None 
|  | New seat.New member elected November 5, 1895.Republican gain.Successor seated January 4, 1896 upon statehood.
| nowrap | 

|}

References 

 
1895